Casparus F. Pruyn House is a historic home located in the hamlet of Newtonville within the town of Colonie in Albany County, New York.  It is a two-story, rectangular five bay wide, center entrance dwelling in a late Federal and early Greek Revival style. It was built between 1824 and 1836.  Pruyn was rent collection agent for Stephen Van Rensselaer and, after Stephen's death, William Van Rensselaer who had inherited the "East Manor" in Rensselaer County. From 1839 to 1844 Pruyn resided at the Patroon Agent's House and Office at Rensselaer and was a central figure in the Anti-Rent War at Rensselaerswyck.  Also on the property are a contributing carriage house, privy, and smoke house. It is open to the public as the historical and cultural arts center for the Town of Colonie. The Verdoy Schoolhouse was moved to the grounds in 1996.

It was listed on the National Register of Historic Places in 1985.

References

External links
Friends of the Pruyn House

History museums in New York (state)
Houses on the National Register of Historic Places in New York (state)
Federal architecture in New York (state)
Houses in Albany County, New York
Museums in Albany County, New York
National Register of Historic Places in Albany County, New York
Houses completed in 1836
1836 establishments in New York (state)
Pruyn family